{{DISPLAYTITLE:C16H17NO2}}
The molecular formula C16H17NO2 (molar mass: 255.312 g/mol, exact mass: 255.1259 u) may refer to:

 SKF-38,393
 UWA-001, or methylenedioxymephenidine

Molecular formulas